Al-Sīrah al-Nabawiyyah, by Ibn Hisham, 'The Life of the Prophet'; is an edited recension of Ibn Isḥāq's Sīratu Rasūli l-Lāh 'The Life of God's Messenger'. Ibn Isḥāq's now lost work survives only in Ibn Hishām's and al-Tabari's recensions, although fragments of several others survive, and Ibn Hishām and al-Tabarī share virtually the same material.

Ibn Hishām explains in the preface of the work, the criteria by which he made his choice from the original work of Ibn Isḥāq in the tradition of his disciple Ziyād al-Baqqāʾi (d. 799). Accordingly, Ibn Hishām omits stories from Al-Sīrah that contain no mention of Muḥammad, certain poems, traditions whose accuracy Ziyād al-Baqqāʾi  could not confirm, and offensive passages that could offend the reader. Al-Tabari includes controversial episodes of the Satanic Verses including an apocryphal story about Muḥammad's attempted suicide. Ibn Hishām gives more accurate versions of the poems he includes and supplies explanations of difficult terms and phrases of the Arabic language, additions of genealogical content to certain proper names, and brief descriptions of the places mentioned in Al-Sīrah. Ibn Hishām appends his notes to the corresponding passages of the original text with the words: "qāla Ibn Hishām" (Ibn Hishām says).

History of compilation

The first biographers of Prophet Muhammad were Urwa ibn al-Zubayr (d. 714), Aban ibn Uthman (d. 727), Wahb ibn Munabbih (d. 732), Sharhabil ibn Sa'd (d. 745), Ibn Shihāb al-Zuhrī (d. 746), and Abu Bakr ibn Muhammad ibn Hazm (d. 757). All their books perished with the exception of some parts which were scattered throughout main references on history like Tarikh al-Tabari. Only a piece of Wahb ibn Munabbih's book is currently stored in Heidelberg, Germany. After this came a generation of biographers, the most renowned of which were Musa ibn 'Uqbah (d. 763), Mu'ammar ibn Rashid (d. 772), and Muhammad ibn Ishaq (d. 774). This generation was followed by Ziyad al-Buka'i (d. 805), Al-Waqidi (d. 829), Ibn Hisham (d. 218), and Muhammad ibn Sa'd (d. 852).  Of the mentioned biographers, Ibn Ishaq's biography from the early Abbasid period was the most renowned and highly documented. After half a century, Ibn Hisham rewrote the biography through one person, Ziyād al-Baqqāʾi. Ibn Ishaq's book was not in the form that it has today. This is because Ibn Hisham examined Ibn Ishaq's work by editing, abridging, making additions, and sometimes criticizing and objecting through the narrations of other scholars. Ibn Hisham never changed or added a word of Ibn Ishaq unless he was explaining or refuting a narration when he would refer to a modification by stating  "qāla Ibn Hishām" (Ibn Hishām says).

Reconstruction of text
Ibn Isḥaq collected oral traditions about the life of the Islamic Prophet Muhammad. These traditions, which he orally dictated to his pupils, are now known collectively as Sīratu Rasūli l-Lāh ( "Life of the Messenger of God"). The original text of the Sīrat Rasūl Allāh by Ibn Ishaq did not survive. An edited copy, or recension, of his work by his student al-Bakka'i, which was further edited by ibn Hisham. Al-Bakka'i's work has perished and only ibn Hisham's has survived, in copies.

Ibn Hisham also "abbreviated, annotated, and sometimes altered" the text of Ibn Ishaq, according to Guillaume (at p. xvii). Interpolations made by Ibn Hisham are said to be recognizable and can be deleted, leaving as a remainder, a so-called "edited" version of Ibn Ishaq's original text (otherwise lost). In addition, Guillaume (at p. xxxi) points out that Ibn Hisham's version omits various narratives in the text which were given by al-Tabari in his History. In these passages al-Tabari expressly cites Ibn Ishaq as a source.

Thus can be reconstructed an 'improved' "edited" text, i.e., by distinguishing or removing Ibn Hisham's additions, and by adding from al-Tabari passages attributed to Ibn Ishaq. Yet the result's degree of approximation to Ibn Ishaq's original text can only be conjectured. Such a reconstruction is available, e.g., in Guillaume's translation. Here, Ibn Ishaq's introductory chapters describe pre-Islamic Arabia, before he then commences with the narratives surrounding the life of Muhammad (in Guillaume at pp. 109–690).

Translations and editions
Later Ibn Hishām's As-Sira would chiefly be transmitted by his pupil, Ibn al-Barqī.  This treatment of Ibn Ishāq's work was circulated to scholars in Cordoba in Islamic Spain by around 864. The first printed edition was published in Arabic by the German orientalist Ferdinand Wüstenfeld, in Göttingen (1858-1860).  The  Life of Moḥammad According to Moḥammed b. Ishāq, ed. 'Abd al-Malik b. Hisham. Gustav Weil (Stuttgart 1864) was the first published translation.

In the 20th century the book has been printed several times in the Middle East.  The German orientalist Gernot Rotter produced an abridged (about one third) German translation of The life of the Prophet. As-Sīra An-Nabawīya. (Spohr, Kandern in the Black Forest 1999).  An English translation by the British orientalist Alfred Guillaume: The Life of Muhammad. A translation of Ishaq's Sirat Rasul Allah. (1955); 11th edition. (Oxford University Press, Karachi 1996).

Influence

Ibn Ishaq's works had been referenced numerous times as a major source of information by future scholars who would delve into the biography of Prophet Muhammad. For a very long time, the biography by Ibn Ishaq was known amongst Islamic scholars as the biography by Ibn Hisham because Ibn Hisham narrated and edited it. Ibn Khallikan said, "Ibn Hisham is who compiled the biography of the Messenger of Allah from battles and stories narrated by Ibn Ishaq and it is the biography in the people's hands, known as the biography by Ibn Hisham". This work was studied carefully by commentators. For instance, Abdul-Qasim Abdur-Rahman as-Suhayli (d. 581) presented an extensive annotation of the biography of his book, Ar-Rawd al-Anf. After this, Abu Dharr al-Khushayni (d. 604) examined the book by explaining the parts that were unclear, as well as providing some criticism in his Sharh Al-Sirah al-Nabawiyyah.

See also
 Prophetic biography
 List of biographies of Muhammad
 List of Islamic scholars
 List of Sunni books

Notes

References

External links
 
 The earliest biography of Muhammad, by ibn Ishaq in English
 Bibliography at Goodreads

Biographies of Muhammad
Sunni literature
8th-century Arabic books